The following is the final results of the Iran Super League 2000/01 basketball season.

Participated teams

Foolad Mobarakeh Isfahan
Homa Tehran
Iran Nara Tehran
Moghavemat Basij Shiraz
Paykan Tehran
Rah Ahan Tehran
Shahrdari Gorgan
Zob Ahan Isfahan

Final standing
Zob Ahan Isfahan
Foolad Mobarakeh Isfahan
Iran Nara Tehran

External links
 Asia-Basket
 iranbasketball.org

Iranian Basketball Super League seasons
League
Iran